The People's Choice Podcast Awards, better known as the Podcast Awards, are global awards given annually to the best podcasts as voted by the general public. Founded in 2005 by Todd Cochrane of Podcast Connect Inc., the Podcast Awards changed hands for a short period by New Media Expo in September 2014 until New Media Expo's demise. The first Podcast Awards show was held in 2006 (awarding shows for the 2005 calendar year) had over 350,000 people vote for their nominated podcasts, with nearly 1000 people attending the awards ceremony. The 10th annual Podcast Awards Show, the first show run exclusively by the New Media Expo, took place at Westgate Las Vegas Resort and Casino on April 14, 2015. It was hosted by Chris Jericho and Emily Morse. The 12th Annual event started with a complete site rebuild and change to the overall process.

Rules
The nominations begin on a set date (July 1, 2017 for the 2017 awards) and continue for thirty days. Listeners can nominate shows from 20 categories over the 30 day period once a day.  Podcasts have had to pre-register in order to participate and listeners are allowed to select the shows they want to nominate from within the pre-registered list of shows.

After the thirty days of nominations, Podcast Connect Committee will review all the nominations over a 15 day period and a slate announced.

Once up to ten nominees in each category have been established, the final voting slate is released. Voting in this round are selected by a panel of judges as outlined in the podcast awards rule.

Categories and winners
The Podcast Awards consists of twenty-two categories. Winners are announced during a ceremony which includes a live web stream. The prizes awarded to winners are donation/sponsor-driven via PayPal. In 2009, they were able to award podcasters almost $3,500 in prizes, with additional website exposure through 2009–2010 of seventeen million plus hits.

†The Podcast Awards were not held in 2014.

*Prior to 2010, Science and Technology were combined as one category.

Podcast awards are awarded for the previous calendar year. For example, the 2014 awards ceremony took place on April 14, 2015.

One-time awards
2005 – Music/Radio: Coverville
2005 – Nonenglish: Annik Rubens: Schlaflos in München 
2005 – Top Rated: Slice of SciFi
2005 – World News: Kathleen Keating
2006 – Best Podcast directory: Apple iTunes

Criticism
Some critics have complained that the Podcast Awards lack publicity, which results in the same podcasts winning awards every year. While some podcasters are aware of the awards and mobilize their listeners to vote, many do not realize they exist.

See also
List of web awards

References

External links
 Podcast Awards website
 Podcast Connect Inc.
 Podcast Connect archive of the Podcast Awards

Podcasting awards
Web awards
Awards established in 2005